Vo (majuscule: Ո; minuscule: ո; Armenian: վո, վօ) is the twenty-fourth letter of the Armenian alphabet. It has a numerical value of 600. It was created by Mesrop Mashtots in the 5th century AD. It represents the open-mid back rounded vowel, but when it occurs isolated or word-initially, it represents . It is one of the two letters that represent the sound O, the other being Օ which was not created by Mashtots.

Its minuscule variant is homoglyphic to the minuscule form of the  Latin letter N. In its uppercase form, it looks like a turned Latin letter U, the Lisu letter Ue (ꓵ), or the asomtavruli form of the Georgian letter ghani (Ⴖ).

As a component in U
This letter, along with Vyun (or Hiwn in Classical Armenian), is part of the Armenian U (ՈՒ Ու ու). Because the letter U is not present in Mashtots's alphabet, it uses a digraph made up of these letters.

Computing codes

Braille

Related characters and other similar characters
 O o : Latin letter O
 О о : Cyrillic letter O
 Օ օ : Armenian letter O
 ꓵ : Lisu letter Ue
 ՈՒ Ու ու : Armenian letter U
 Ⴖ : Georgian letter Ghani, in asomtavruli form

See also
 Armenian alphabet
 Mesrop Mashtots

References

External links
 Ո on Wiktionary
 ո on Wiktionary

Notes
Except in ով /ov/ "who" and ովքեր /ovkʰer/ "those (people)" in Eastern Armenian

Armenian letters